José María Rodríguez Rodríguez, also known as  Mayia (June 13, 1849 - May 25, 1903), was a Cuban military man who served in the Ten Years War

Cuban military personnel
1849 births
1903 deaths